Sandra Aguinaldo (born April 29, 1975) is a Filipina television news anchor journalist, writer and documentarian.  She is best known as one of the news reporters of 24 Oras and one of the hosts of I-Witness.  In 2015, Aguinaldo together with her co-hosts in I-Witness won as the Best Documentary Program Hosts during the 29th PMPC Star Awards for Television.

Early life

Aguinaldo is the only child of Felipe, her father who is an engineer, and Irene, her mother who died when she was four years old. She grew up at Angono, Rizal and she spent her childhood liking different kinds of art. She developed her writing skills in high school and decided to take up journalism at University of Santo Tomas (UST) where she graduated.  In 1993, she became the editor-in-chief of The Flame, UST Faculty of Arts and Letters' official student journal.

Career

After Aguinaldo graduated from college, she became a copywriter at an advertising firm. In 1996, she entered the broadcast industry and was the head writer of Usapang Business, a television program of ABS-CBN. After a year, she went to print media and became the senior report of The Manila Times.

Eventually, she worked for GMA Network as news reporter for 24 Oras and Saksi. She also hosted I-Witness, a television documentary program of GMA Network. She initially joined I-Witness in 2006 when Vicky Morales took a leave of absence and she was a temporary replacement but eventually, she became a regular of the show.

When she started as a reporter for GMA Network, she was assigned to difficult reporting tasks such as the conflict in Mindanao, particularly in Jolo, Sulu, where she interviewed members of the Abu Sayyaf, Moro National Liberation Front and Moro Islamic Liberation Front; and she also covered the bombings in Israel. During the campaign of the Philippine presidential election in 2004 and before she was going to report for 24 Oras, she was berated by presidential candidate Fernando Poe, Jr. due to her presence at the stage. Two days after the incident, they were reconciled.

In I-Witness, she was able to produced different kinds of documentary including topics about poverty, which was questioned in 2012 when Aguinaldo and her co-hosts were at the "docufest" in Baguio. It was asked that "in continuing to feature stories of poverty, are documentaries a form of exploitation?". For Aguinaldo, when she makes documentary about poverty, she tries to give inspiration instead of making the poor people depressed. Her documentary entitled "Pasan-Pasan" is about children with disability who goes to school despite being handicapped. She also presented the documentary entitled "Iskul ko No. 1", which is about the Sindagan Elementary School, a school in Southern Leyte ranked top one in the 2006 National Achievement Test for graduating students. "Iskul ko No. 1" won silver medal during the 2007 New York Festivals.

In 2014, Aguinaldo together with Arnold Clavio were awarded by USTv of University of Santo Tomas as the Outstanding Thomasian Media Personalities. In 2015, Aguinaldo together with Kara David, Howie Severino and Jay Taruc won as the Best Documentary Program Hosts for I-Witness during the 29th PMPC Star Awards for Television. In 2016, Aguinaldo together with Kara David were nominated in the same category during the 30th PMPC Star Awards for Television but they lost.

Personal life

Aguinaldo is married to Brimar Rodica, a police officer whom Aguinaldo met during a funeral in Pangasinan.

Awards

References

1975 births
Living people
Filipino television journalists
GMA Network personalities
GMA Integrated News and Public Affairs people
Women television journalists
University of Santo Tomas alumni
People from Rizal